Dou Wan was a Western Han noblewoman married to Liu Sheng, Prince of Zhongshan, a brother of Emperor Wu of Han. Her tomb was discovered in Mancheng County, and many of her burial goods, including her jade burial suit, have been declared national treasures.

Biography
The date of her death is thought to have been between 118 and 104 BCE, and it remains a point of debate as to whether she died before her husband or after him.

Tomb
Dou Wan's burial is one of few Han elite burials that have not been robbed. The wealth represented by her and Liu Sheng's tombs was unprecedented when it was excavated, with Dou Wan's burial alone containing a total of 5,124 artefacts, including jade, silk, lacquer, and bronze.

Location
The tomb of Dou Wan is located on the eastern slope of a hill known locally as Lingshan, which lies to the south-west of the Mancheng County seat in Hubei Province, to the east of the Taihang Mountains. In the Western Han, this area was part of Beiping County in the north of Zhongshan State. Dou Wan's tomb is located approximately 120 m north of her husband's, and 18 other members of Liu Sheng's family were buried on Lingshan's southern slope.

Discovery
Archaeologists excavated the tomb of Liu Sheng in 1968. When finishing the excavation, they noticed signs of stone cutting on a hill several hundred metres to the north. Test excavations revealed the presence of another large tomb and full excavations were conducted from August to September 1968.

Tomb structure

Dou Wan was buried separately from her husband but their two tombs together form a pair. A 6–14 m wide stone-cut path links the entrance to Dou Wan's tomb with her husband's.

Burial goods
Dou Wan's body was encased in a jade burial suit constructed from 2,160 pieces of jade stitched together with gold thread. The suit was intricately constructed to fit her body, and the head part is shaped to represent eyes, ears, a nose, and a mouth.

Hers and her husband's were the first jade burial suits to be discovered by archaeologists. These burial suits were made to protect the people from the flesh-soul. The common belief of this period was that every human being owned two souls: a flesh-soul and a breath-soul. The breath-soul escapes after the death of a person, but the flesh-soul remains in the body for a period of about a year. The flesh soul was supposed to be very malignant, so the wealthy were plated in jade suits to prevent it from escaping the body.

Inside a back chamber of the grave, a house-like construction was found, built to imitate the outside world. Amongst the inventory there was also a number of sexual tools.

Notes

References
 
 
 

Archaeology of China
2nd-century BC Chinese women
2nd-century BC Chinese people